Rod Elliott (born 16 June 1951) is a former  Australian rules footballer who played with North Melbourne in the Victorian Football League (VFL).

Notes

External links 

Living people
1951 births
Australian rules footballers from Victoria (Australia)
North Melbourne Football Club players